Vengara may refer to:

Places 
 Vengara, Malappuram district, Kerala, India
 Vengara (Kannur district), Kerala, India
 Vengara (State Assembly constituency), state legislative assembly constituencies in Kerala state
 Vengarai, Tamil Nadu, India
 Vengarai Periakottainadu, Tamil Nadu, India
 Vengarai Thippanvidudhi, Tamil Nadu, India

Surname 
 Ibrahim Vengara (born 1941), politician